Andriivka is an urban-type settlement in Izium Raion of Kharkiv Oblast in Ukraine. It is located on the left bank of the Siverskyi Donets. Andriivka belongs to Donets settlement hromada, one of the hromadas of Ukraine. Population: 

Until 18 July 2020, Andriivka belonged to Balakliia Raion. The raion was abolished in July 2020 as part of the administrative reform of Ukraine, which reduced the number of raions of Kharkiv Oblast to seven. The area of Balakliia Raion was merged into Izium Raion.

Economy

Transportation
Shebelinka and Andriivka railway stations are both located in Andriivka and are on the railway line connecting Kharkiv and Lyman via Izium. There is frequent passenger traffic.

The settlement has road access to both Kharkiv and Izium, via Balakliia.

References

Urban-type settlements in Izium Raion